SS Barcoo was a 1,505 gross register ton passenger ship built by William Denny & Brothers, Dumbarton in 1885 for the Queensland Steam Shipping Company. She was transferred upon merger of parent company to the Australasian United Steam Navigation Company in 1857. She was hulked in 1911 and requisitioned by the Royal Australian Navy in 1914 and utilised as a coal hulk in Sydney Harbour.

Fate
Barcoo was scuttled by naval gunfire on 1 February 1924 off Sydney Heads in the Sydney Disposal Area.

Notes

1885 ships
Ships built on the River Clyde
Auxiliary ships of the Royal Australian Navy
Coastal passenger vessels of Australia
Iron and steel steamships of Australia
Scuttled vessels of New South Wales